Suzanne Lafont (born 1949) is a French photographer.

Life and career 
In 1992 she had a solo exhibition titled Projects 37: Suzanne Lafont at the Museum of Modern Art in New York.

Her work is included in the collections of the National Gallery of Canada, the Metropolitan Museum of Art, the Fonds régional d'art contemporain Pays de la Loire and Lorraine, the Museo Reina Sofia, Madrid, among others.

She has participated to Documenta IX and Documenta X.

Lafont was born in Nîmes. She is represented by Erna Hecey Gallery in Luxembourg.

Selected publications 

 Jean Francois Chevrier, Interview with Christsian Milovanoff, Suzanne Lafont : 1984-1988. Marseille: Musées de Marseille, Arles: Actes Sud, 1989, 
Jean-François Chevrier, Catherine David, Suzanne Lafont. Paris: Galerie nationale du Jeu de paume, 1992 
Chantal Pontbriand, Suzanne Lafont, Rochechouart: Musée départemental d'art contemporain de Rochechouart, 1997 
 Paul Sztulman, Suzanne Lafont. Paris: éd. Hazan, 1998 
L, lecture : 46 épisodes. Arles: Actes Sud, 2001 
 Marie de Brugerolle, Suzanne Lafont, Appelé par son nom. Arles: Actes Sud, 2003 
 Marcella Lista, Suzanne Lafont : Situations. La Garenne Colombes: Bernard Chauveau Editeur, 2015.

References

External links 
 Suzanne Lafont by Damarice Amao for Aware.
 Suzanne Lafont at Erna Hecey Gallery.

21st-century French women artists
1949 births
Living people
21st-century French photographers
20th-century French women artists
20th-century French photographers
French women photographers
People from Nîmes
20th-century women photographers
21st-century women photographers